Cupid the Cowpuncher is a 1920 American western comedy film directed by Clarence G. Badger and written by Edfrid A. Bingham. It is based on the 1907 novel Cupid: The Cow-Punch by Eleanor Gates. The film stars Will Rogers, Helene Chadwick, Andrew Robson, Lloyd Whitlock, Guinn "Big Boy" Williams and Tex Parker. The film was released on July 25, 1920, by Goldwyn Pictures.

Cast       
Will Rogers as Alec Lloyd
Helene Chadwick as Macie Sewell
Andrew Robson as Zack Sewell
Lloyd Whitlock as Dr. Leroy Simpson
Guinn "Big Boy" Williams as Hairoil Johnson 
Tex Parker as Monkey Mike
Roy Laidlaw as Dr. Billy Trowbridge
Catherine Wallace as Rose 
Nelson McDowell as Sheriff Bergin
Cordelia Callahan as Mrs. Bergin

References

External links
 

1920 films
1920s English-language films
Silent American Western (genre) films
Silent American comedy films
1920 comedy films
Goldwyn Pictures films
Films directed by Clarence G. Badger
American silent feature films
American black-and-white films
1920s American films

Films based on American novels